Come Upstairs is the ninth studio album by American singer-songwriter Carly Simon, released by Warner Bros. Records, on June 16, 1980. 

It was the first of her three albums for Warner Bros. and it has a harder, more rock-oriented sound than her previous albums. Whereas those earlier records were prime examples of the singer-songwriter genre, with soft-rocking arrangements primarily built around piano and/or acoustic guitar accompaniment, Come Upstairs uses electric guitars and synthesizers prominently. The album reached No. 36 on the Billboard 200.

The first single released from the album was "Jesse", an acoustic ballad that was more in the style of Simon's earlier work rather than an example of her new sound. "Jesse" became a major hit, remaining on the Billboard Hot 100 singles chart for over six months, peaking at No. 11, and was certified Gold by the RIAA for sales of more than 1,000,000 copies in the United States alone. It also reached No. 12 in Canada, and No. 4 in Australia, becoming Simon's biggest hit there since "You're So Vain".

Reception

AllMusic reviewer William Ruhlmann retrospectively called "Jesse" the album's highlight and declared it "Simon's best-written pop/rock song since 'You're So Vain' and a Top Ten hit to boot." He additionally singled out the title track as "frisky and seductive", referred to "Take Me as I Am" as "an upbeat raver", and compared the track "Them" to the band Devo. Ruhlmann stated "Simon's emotions were unusually close to the surface throughout, 'James' was a final plea to her soon-to-depart husband, and 'In Pain' was the brutal cry of someone who sounded like she was."

Reviewing the single "Jesse", Billboard wrote that "the melody is simple yet powerful, the words are complex and Simon's voice has never been better. She croons an enriching country-ish melody which perks up at the end with the addition of electric guitar, and complements it with a sensitive story." Cash Box said that the song "embodies the push and pull of love, the ailment and the cure - the person we try to resist but cannot."

Reviewing the single "Take Me As I Am", Record World said that "Carly is distraught over a lover with a wandering heart" and praised the hook.

Record World called the title track a "saucy invitation [that] is full of lyrical nocturnal delights."

Track listing
Credits adapted from the album's liner notes.

Personnel

Musicians

Production

Charts
Album – Billboard (United States)

Album – International

Singles – Billboard (United States)

See also
List of Top 25 singles for 1981 in Australia

References

External links
Carly Simon's Official Website

1980 albums
Carly Simon albums
Warner Records albums
Albums with cover art by Mick Rock